XLU or xlu may refer to:

 XLU, the IATA code for Leo Airport, Sissili, Burkina Faso
 xlu, the ISO 639-3 code for Cuneiform Luwian language, Hittite Empire, Arzawa and Neo-Hittite kingdoms